Eremochrysa pallida is a species of green lacewing in the family Chrysopidae. It is found in North America.

References

Further reading

 
 
 
 
 
 
 
 

Chrysopidae
Insects described in 1911